Frederick Carlton Weyand (September 15, 1916 – February 10, 2010) was a general in the United States Army. Weyand was the last commander of United States military operations in the Vietnam War from 1972 to 1973, and served as the 28th Chief of Staff of the United States Army from 1974 to 1976.

Early life and education
Weyand was born in Arbuckle, California, on September 15, 1916. He attended and graduated from Fresno High School.
He was commissioned a second lieutenant in the United States Army through the Reserve Officers Training Corps program at the University of California, Berkeley, where he graduated in May 1938. He married Arline Langhart in 1940.

Military career

World War II, Korean War and interbellum
From 1940 to 1942, Weyand was assigned to active duty and served with the 6th Field Artillery. He graduated from the Command and General Staff College at Fort Leavenworth in 1942 and served as adjutant of the Harbor Defense Command in San Francisco from 1942 to 1943. He moved on to the Office of the Chief of Intelligence for the US War Department General Staff in 1944. He became assistant chief of staff for intelligence in the China-Burma-India Theater from 1944 to 1945. In the immediate aftermath of the war he was in the Military Intelligence Service in Washington, D.C. from 1945 to 1946.

Weyand was chief of staff for intelligence, United States Army Forces, Middle Pacific from 1946 to 1949. He graduated from the United States Army Infantry School at Fort Benning in 1950. He became commander of the 1st Battalion, 7th Infantry Regiment and the assistant chief of staff, G–3, of the 3d Infantry Division during the Korean War from 1950 to 1951.

Weyand served on the faculty of the Infantry School from 1952 to 1953. Following this assignment he attended the Armed Forces Staff College, and upon graduation became military assistant in the Office of the Assistant Secretary of the Army for Financial Management until 1954. He moved on to become military assistant and executive to the Secretary of the Army from 1954 to 1957. He then graduated from the Army War College in 1958, moving on to command the 3d Battalion, 6th Infantry Regiment, in Europe (1958–1959). He served in the Office of the United States Commander in Berlin in 1960 then became chief of staff for the Communications Zone, United States Army, Europe from 1960 to 1961. He was the deputy chief and chief of legislative liaison for the Department of the Army from 1961 to 1964.

Vietnam War
Weyand became commander of the 25th Infantry Division, stationed in Hawaii, in 1964. He continued to lead the division as it was introduced into operations in Vietnam in 1965 and 1966. He served as the head of the 25th Division until 1967, when he became deputy, then acting commander, and finally commander of II Field Force, Vietnam responsible for III Corps Tactical Zone comprising the 11 provinces around Saigon. In 1968, he became chief of the Office of Reserve Components.

A dissenter from General William Westmoreland's more conventional war strategy, Weyand's experience as a former intelligence officer gave him a sense of the enemy's intentions. He realized that "the key to success in Vietnam was in securing and pacifying the towns and villages of South Vietnam" (Mark Salter, John McCain "Hard Call: The Art of Great Decisions"). Weyand managed to convince a reluctant General Westmoreland to allow him to redeploy troops away from the Cambodian border area closer to Saigon, significantly contributing to making the 1968 Tet Offensive a military catastrophe for North Vietnam.

Before the 1968 holiday truce for Tet went into effect, Fred Weyand got the feeling that "something was coming that was going to be pretty bad, and it wasn't going to be up on the Laotian border somewhere, it was going to be right in our own backyard."  Westmoreland's obsession with the enemy hitting the Marines at Khe Sanh turned out to be a tactical feint, and the Communist strategy all along was a multi-pronged, simultaneous attack of key cities (Hue', Da Nang, Nha Trang, Quinhon, Kontum, Banmethuot, My Tho, Can Tho, Ben Tre and Saigon) 

From his Tactical Operations Center, most incredibly, Fred Weyand denied the Communists from taking Saigon. A perfect surprise attack, the jewel in the crown of the Communist offensive would have been the fall of Saigon.  He "had prepared better than he could have known for a battle he could never have anticipated." The Tet offensive had the "will-breaking effect" on the American psyche, equivalent to that of Dien Bien Phu to the French.

In 1969, Weyand was named the military advisor to Ambassador Henry Cabot Lodge, Jr. at the Paris Peace Talks. In 1970 he became assistant chief of staff for force development. Later in 1970, he became deputy commander of Military Assistance Command, Vietnam (MACV).  

Weyand succeeded General Creighton Abrams, who was appointed as Army Chief of Staff, as commander of MACV on June 30, 1972. By the end of 1972 General Weyand had overseen the withdrawal of all United States military forces from South Vietnam. In March 1973, Weyand was awarded the National Order of Vietnam, first class and the Vietnamese Gallantry Cross.

Senior commands and Chief of Staff
Weyand served briefly as Commander in Chief of the United States Army Pacific in 1973 and was Vice Chief of Staff of the United States Army from May 1973 to October 1974.

Weyand was appointed as Chief of Staff of the United States Army from October 3, 1974 to September 30, 1976. As Chief of Staff he supervised army moves to improve the combat-to-support troop ratio, to achieve a sixteen-division force, to enhance the effectiveness of roundout units, and to improve personnel and logistical readiness. Weyand retired from active service in October 1976.

Confidential source for 1967 New York Times article
In an editorial in The New York Times on December 11, 2006, Murray Fromson, a reporter for CBS during the Vietnam War, stated that General Weyand had agreed to reveal himself as the confidential source for New York Times reporter R.W. Apple, Jr.'s August 7, 1967, story "Vietnam: The Signs of Stalemate." General Weyand, then commander of III Corps in Vietnam, was the unidentified high-ranking officer who told Apple and Fromson (reporting the same story for CBS) that:

The story was the first intimation that war was reaching a stalemate, and contributed to changing sentiment about the war.

Dates of rank

Awards and decorations
His awards and decorations include:

Personal life

After retiring from the United States Army in 1976, Weyand moved to Honolulu, Hawaii, which was also the home of the 25th Infantry Division. He became active in Hawai'i community affairs and held a number of prominent business positions, including corporate secretary and senior vice president of First Hawaiian Bank between 1976 and 1982. He was an active member of the Rotary Club of Honolulu and a trustee of the now-dissolved Samuel M. Damon Estate, as well as the American Red Cross Hawaii Chapter, where he served as chairman of the board in 1992 and director of the Honolulu Symphony. He was active in the Sony Open golf tournament, Shriners Club, the East-West Center, the Asia-Pacific Center for Security Studies, and the Hawaii Theatre.

Weyand was also a member of the Vietnam Veterans Leadership Program and a member of several military and veteran organizations, such as the Association of the United States Army, the Air Force Association, the Military Officers Association of America, the 25th Infantry Division Association, the Go for Broke Association (100th Infantry Battalion, 442nd Infantry Regiment), the 3rd Infantry Division Association, and the associated 7th Infantry Regiment Association.

After his first wife died in 2001, Weyand married Mary Foster. He died on February 10, 2010, of natural causes at the Kahala Nui retirement residence in Honolulu, Hawaii.

References

External links

Weyand Bibliography  in Commanding Generals and Chiefs of Staff of the Army, a publication of the United States Army Center of Military History.
Murray Fromson's article revealing Weyand as source

|-

|-

1916 births
2010 deaths
People from Colusa County, California
Military personnel from California
United States Army generals
Recipients of the Distinguished Service Cross (United States)
Recipients of the Distinguished Service Medal (US Army)
Recipients of the Legion of Merit
1 Weyand, Frederick
Recipients of the Silver Star
Recipients of the Gallantry Cross (Vietnam)
Recipients of the Cross of the Order of Merit of the Federal Republic of Germany
United States Army Vice Chiefs of Staff
United States Army Chiefs of Staff
United States Army Command and General Staff College alumni
University of California, Berkeley alumni
Recipients of the Defense Distinguished Service Medal
Joint Forces Staff College alumni
United States Army War College alumni